Xuray or Khuray may refer to:
Xuray, Khachmaz, Azerbaijan
Xuray, Qusar, Azerbaijan